Charles Collier may refer to:

Charles A. Collier (1848–1900), American banker, lawyer, and Mayor of Atlanta, Georgia
Charles Fenton Collier (1828–1899), American lawyer and politician from Virginia
Charlie Collier (1885–1954), English motorcycle racer
Chuck Collier (1947–2011), American radio personality